Shames is a surname. Notable people with the surname include:

Edward Shames (1922–2021), American army officer
Laurence Shames (born 1951), American writer
Stephen Shames (born 1947), American photojournalist

See also
Shales (surname)
Shamos (surname)